Becky Taylor Branch is a  long first-order tributary to Marshyhope Creek in Dorchester County, Maryland.

Course
Becky Taylor Branch rises about 2 miles northeast of Eldorado, Maryland and then flows southwest to join Marshyhope Creek about 1 mile southeast of Eldorado, Maryland.

Watershed
Becky Taylor Branch drains  of area, receives about 44.3 in/year of precipitation, and is about 14.74% forested.

See also
List of Maryland rivers

References

Rivers of Maryland
Rivers of Dorchester County, Maryland
Tributaries of the Nanticoke River